West Jefferson is an unincorporated community in Williams County, in the U.S. state of Ohio. It is not the same as West Jefferson, a village in Madison County in Central Ohio.

History
Former variant names of West Jefferson were Durbins Corners and Karle. A post office called Durbins Corners was established in 1850, the name was changed to Karle in 1882, and the post office closed in 1902. Besides the post office, West Jefferson had a country store.

References

Unincorporated communities in Williams County, Ohio
Unincorporated communities in Ohio